Daniel James Schofield (born 10 April 1980) is an English former footballer and manager who is currently head coach of EFL League Two club Doncaster Rovers.

Playing career

Huddersfield Town
Schofield was signed by Huddersfield Town from Brodsworth Welfare for a fee of £2,000 in 1998. Although Schofield made his debut in the 1998–99 season against Crewe Alexandra, his first full season in the team came in the 2001–02 season when he found the net 11 times operating as a striker, since then he had been playing as an attacking right sided midfielder until was moved to the left side of midfield.

On 28 February 2008, it was revealed on Huddersfield Town's official website that Danny had requested a move away from the club. Manager, Andy Ritchie explained his name had been circulated with a view to either a loan switch or permanent deal at the end of the season. Yeovil Town were the favorites to capture his signature, although Chesterfield and Rotherham United did also show interest in the midfielder.

On 26 April, he scored on his last home game for Huddersfield Town against Walsall. Huddersfield won the game 2–0.

Yeovil Town
The day after being officially released by Huddersfield Town, he agreed to join Yeovil Town, with effect from 1 July.

Millwall
On 1 September 2009, Schofield agreed to join League One side Millwall on a two-year deal, after an undisclosed fee was accepted by Yeovil.

Rotherham United
At the end of June 2011, Schofield joined League Two club Rotherham United on a free transfer. After not featuring in new Rotherham manager Steve Evans plans for the 2012–13 season, Schofield joined Accrington Stanley on loan for three months on 12 September 2012. He returned to Rotherham United in December 2012, after making 8 appearances on loan. On 13 March 2013, Schofield joined Conference Premier side Stockport County on loan until the end of the season.

After not making an appearance for Rotherham since 2012, Schofield was released at the end of the 2013–14 season.

Return to non-league and retirement
After his release from Rotherham, Schofield joined Conference Premier side FC Halifax Town following a successful trial.

On 28 June 2015, Schofield joined National League North club Bradford Park Avenue as a player-coach.

After a season with Bradford, Schofield joined Northern Premier League Premier Division side Mickleover Sports ahead of the 2016–17 season. In his final season as a player Schofield made 22 league appearances for Mickleover.

Coaching career
While still a player with Rotherham United, Schofield began coaching in the Barnsley youth academy working with the under-12s, under-13s and under-14s. In 2015, Schofield then spent a season as a player-coach with National League North club Bradford Park Avenue.

In December 2016, Schofield joined Leeds United as a coach working with the under-15s and under16s. Schofield was promoted to the role of Professional Development Phase Coach, working with the under-23's alongside Carlos Corberán. Corberán and Schofield's under-23 side won the 2018–19 Professional Development League Northern League, and then became the national Professional Development League champions by beating Birmingham City under-23s in the final. In August 2019, Schofield left Leeds United to join fellow Championship side Middlesbrough as the club's new under-23 assistant lead coach.

After six months on Teesside, on 3 February 2020, Schofield returned to Huddersfield Town as under-19 coach. After the sacking of Danny Cowley as Huddersfield Town manager, on 20 July 2020, Schofield was appointed as caretaker manager for the Terriers final Championship fixture of the 2019–20 season. On 22 July 2020, Schofield's only match in charge as caretaker manager resulted in a 4–1 away defeat against Millwall. In August 2020, after the appointment of Carlos Corberán as Huddersfield Town head coach Schofield was promoted to work with the first team as Professional Development Coach and to head up the new B team.

Schofield took charge of the team for the first game of the 2021-22 season as Carlos Corberán was isolating after a positive test for COVID-19.

On 7 July 2022, following the resignation of Corberán, Schofield was named as the new Head Coach of Huddersfield Town, being assisted by Narcís Pèlach. After a run of only 1 win from his first 8 league games, Schofield was relieved of his duties on 14 September 2022.

On 20 October 2022, Schofield was appointed Head Coach of League Two club Doncaster Rovers on a one-year rolling contract.

Career statistics

Player

Managerial

Personal life
Schofield graduated from Manchester Metropolitan University in July 2016 with a bachelor's degree in Sports Science.

References

External links

1980 births
Living people
Footballers from Doncaster
English footballers
English football managers
Association football wingers
Association football forwards
Association football coaches
Northern Counties East Football League players
English Football League players
National League (English football) players
Northern Premier League players
Brodsworth Welfare A.F.C. players
Huddersfield Town A.F.C. players
Yeovil Town F.C. players
Millwall F.C. players
Rotherham United F.C. players
Accrington Stanley F.C. players
Stockport County F.C. players
FC Halifax Town players
Bradford (Park Avenue) A.F.C. players
Mickleover Sports F.C. players
Barnsley F.C. non-playing staff
Leeds United F.C. non-playing staff
Middlesbrough F.C. non-playing staff
Huddersfield Town A.F.C. non-playing staff
Huddersfield Town A.F.C. managers
Doncaster Rovers F.C. managers
English Football League managers
Alumni of Manchester Metropolitan University